Hugh Leonard Thompson Murphy (2 March 1952 – 16 November 1982) was a Northern Irish loyalist and UVF officer. As leader of the Shankill Butchers gang, Murphy was responsible for many murders, mainly of Catholic civilians, often first kidnapping and torturing his victims. Due to a lack of evidence, Murphy was never brought to trial for these killings, for which some of his followers had already received long sentences in 1979. In the summer of 1982, Murphy was released just over half-way through a 12-year sentence for other offences. He returned to the Shankill Road, where he embarked on a murder spree. Details of his movements were apparently passed by rival loyalist paramilitaries to the Provisional IRA, who shot Murphy dead that autumn.

Early life
Murphy was the youngest of three sons of William and Joyce Murphy from the loyalist Shankill Road, Belfast. His elder brothers were William Jr. and John. William Sr. was originally from Fleet Street, Sailortown in the Belfast docks area. This was where he had met Joyce Thompson, who came from the Shankill. Like his own father (also named William), William Sr. worked as a dock labourer. The Murphy family changed their residence several times; in 1957 they returned to Joyce's family home in the lower Shankill, at 28 Percy Street. Murphy did not use "Hugh" possibly because when coupled with the surname Murphy it might have added to the Catholic connotation. Prior to the erection of a peace wall in the 1970s, Percy Street ran from the lower Shankill area to the Falls Road. At Argyle Primary School, he was known for the use of a knife and had his elder brothers to back him up; he logged his first conviction at the age of twelve for theft. After leaving the Belfast Boys' Model School at sixteen, he joined the Ulster Volunteer Force and was involved in the rioting that broke out in Belfast in August 1969. In his book The Shankill Butchers, Belfast journalist Martin Dillon suggests Murphy's bigoted Loyalism may have stemmed from his bearing a surname associated with Catholics.<ref name="early life">Dillon, Shankill Butchers, pp 4–9</ref>

His character was marked by a hatred of Catholics which he brought into all of his conversations, often referring to them as "scum and animals". He held a steady job as a shop assistant, although his increasing criminal activities enabled him to indulge in a flamboyant lifestyle which involved socialising with an array of young women and heavy drinking.

Dillon wrote that it is "incredible to think that Murphy was in fact a murderer at the age of twenty" (1972). There were many people at the time who would have found it hard to believe as physically he did not differ from most young men of his age. Below average height, of slim build and sallow complexion, Murphy was blue eyed and had curly dark brown hair. He sported several tattoos; most of them bearing Ulster loyalist images. He was a flashy dresser, often wearing a leather jacket and scarf, and occasionally leather driving gloves, such that it reminded one contact of the time of a World War I fighter-pilot.

First crimes

According to Dillon, Murphy was involved in the torture and murder of four Catholic men as early as 1972. On 28 September of that year, a Protestant man named William Edward Pavis who had gone bird shooting with a Catholic priest, was killed at his home in East Belfast. Pavis had been threatened by loyalists who accused him of selling firearms to the IRA. Murphy was arrested for this crime along with an accomplice, Mervyn Connor. During pre-trial investigations, Murphy was placed in a line-up for possible identification by witnesses to Pavis' shooting. Before the process began formally, he created a disturbance and stepped out of the line-up. However, two witnesses picked him out when order was restored.

Connor and Murphy were held in prison together but, in April 1973, before the trial, Connor died after ingesting cyanide in his cell. He had written a suicide note in which he confessed to the crime and exonerated Murphy. It is believed Connor was forced to write the note and take the cyanide. Murphy was sent to trial for the murder of Pavis in June 1973. Although two witnesses identified him as the gunman, he was acquitted on the basis that their evidence may have been affected by the disturbance during the police line-up inquiry. However, Murphy was re-arrested and jailed for attempted escapes.

By May 1975, Murphy, now aged twenty-three, was back on the streets of Belfast. On 5 May 1973, inside the Crumlin Road prison, he had married 19-year-old Margaret Gillespie, with whom he had a daughter. He moved his wife and child to Brookmount Street in the upper Shankill where his parents also had a new home; however, he spent much of his time drinking in Shankill pubs such as The Brown Bear and Lawnbrook Social Club. He also regularly frequented the Bayardo Bar in Aberdeen Street. Murphy later told a Provisional IRA inmate that on 13 August 1975 he had just left the Bayardo ten minutes before the IRA carried out a gun and bombing attack against the pub which killed a UVF man and four other Protestants and left over 50 injured. With his brother William he soon formed a gang of more than twenty men that would become known as the Shankill Butchers, one of his lieutenants being William Moore.

Shankill Butchers murders
The gang shot dead four Catholics (two men and two women) during a robbery at a warehouse in October 1975. Over the next few months, the gang began abducting, torturing and murdering random Catholic men they dragged off the streets late at night. Murphy regarded the use of a blade as the "ultimate way to kill", ending the torture by hacking each victim's throat open with a butcher's knife. By February 1976 the gang had killed three Catholic men in this manner. Murphy achieved status through his paramilitary activity and was widely known in the Shankill. Many regarded his crimes as shaming the community but feared the consequences of testifying against him.Dillon, Martin (1989). Shankill Butchers. pp 66–69, 115–31 None of the victims had any connection to the IRA, and there was suspicion among some of their families that the murders were not properly investigated because those being killed were Catholics.

The Butchers were also involved in the murder of Noel Shaw, a loyalist from a rival UVF unit, who had shot dead Butcher gang-member Archie Waller in Downing Street, off the Shankill Road, in November 1975. Four days before his death, Waller had been involved in the abduction and murder of the Butchers' first victim, Francis Crossen. One day after Waller's death, Shaw was beaten and pistol-whipped by Murphy while strapped to a chair, then shot. His body was later dumped in a back street off the Shankill.

By the end of 1975, the UVF Brigade Staff had a new leadership of "moderates", but Murphy refused to submit to their authority, preferring to carry out attacks by his own methods. Dillon suggested that whilst some of the Brigade Staff knew about Murphy's activities (albeit not the precise details), they were too frightened of him and his gang to put a stop to them. This suggestion was given further credibility by Gusty Spence, when he was asked by BBC journalist Peter Taylor in a 1998 interview why the leadership of the UVF failed to stop the Butchers. "I don't think they had the bottle to stop them", was Spence's reply. On 10 January 1976, Murphy and Moore killed a Catholic man, Edward McQuaid (25), on the Cliftonville Road. Murphy, alighting from Moore's taxi in the small hours, shot the man six times at close range.

Imprisonment

Early on 11 March 1976, Murphy shot and injured a young Catholic woman, once again on the Cliftonville. Arrested the next day after attempting to retrieve the gun used, Murphy was charged with attempted murder and remanded in custody for a prolonged period. However, he was able to plea bargain whereby he was allowed to plead guilty to the lesser charge of a firearms offence, and received twelve years' imprisonment on 11 October 1977. Dillon notes that the police believed Murphy was involved in the Shankill Butcher murders. To divert suspicion from himself Murphy ordered the rest of the gang to continue the cut-throat murders while he was in prison. The Butchers, now under the operational command of William Moore, went on to kill and mutilate at least three more Catholics.

The team of Criminal Investigation Department (CID) detectives investigating the murders was led by Detective Chief Inspector Jimmy Nesbitt who headed C Division based at Tennent Street off the Shankill Road. However, the police were overworked during this period and little progress was made in the investigation until one victim, Gerard McLaverty, survived his assault. Detectives were driving him down the Shankill Road on the way to the scene of his abduction when he recognised two of his assailants walking in the street. This identification of Sam McAllister and Benjamin Edwards led to the arrest of much of the gang in May 1977 and, in February 1979, they were imprisoned for long periods. Confessions of gang members had named Murphy as the leader but statements incriminating him were later retracted. He was questioned once again about the Butcher murders but denied involvement. The total of sentences handed down to the gang at Belfast Crown Court was the longest in legal history in the UK.

Last months on the Shankill
On completing his sentence for the firearms charge, Lenny Murphy walked out of the Maze Prison on Friday, 16 July 1982. During his term inside, his wife Margaret had initiated divorce proceedings which were being finalised at the time of his death. Murphy returned to his old ways, killing at least four more people over the next four months. He beat to death a partially disabled man one day after returning to the Shankill. Another victim sold him a car and was shot dead after demanding full payment. Murphy also attempted to extort money from local businessmen who had been sympathetic in the past; however, this encroached on other loyalist paramilitaries with established protection rackets.

In late August 1982, Murphy killed a part-time Ulster Defence Regiment soldier from the lower Shankill area who was closely involved with the UVF in Ballymena and was allegedly an informer. The man's body was not discovered for almost a year."Murdered Man was not the Shankill Butcher, says mother", News Letter, 18 November 1982. In mid-October, Murphy and several associates kidnapped a Catholic man who was then tortured and beaten to death in Murphy's own house (temporarily vacated due to renovations). Murphy, who had left the house strewn with the victim's blood and teeth, was arrested for questioning the next morning but later released. The sadism of the widely publicised killing led to loyalism receiving a great deal of bad publicity, and leading UVF figures concluded that Murphy's horrific methods had made him too much of a liability.

Death
On 16 November 1982, Murphy had just pulled up outside the rear of his girlfriend's house on the Forthriver Road area of Glencairn, a part of the Greater Shankill Area, when two Provisional IRA gunmen emerged from a black van nearby and opened fire with a sub-machine gun and a 9mm pistol. Murphy was hit by more than twenty rounds and died instantly. He was gunned down just around the corner from where the bodies of many of the Butchers' victims had been dumped. A few days after his death the IRA claimed responsibility. According to RUC reports, the UVF had provided the IRA hit team with the details of Murphy's habits and movements, which allowed them to assassinate him at that particular location. Another line of inquiry ends at UDA leader James Craig, who saw Murphy as a serious threat to his widespread racketeering and provided the IRA with key information on Murphy's movements. Craig was known to meet IRA commanders to discuss their racketeering activities – he was later killed by his comrades for "treason". Top UDA member, Samuel McCrory, alleged that the weapon used to kill Murphy, which he stated was a Sterling submachine gun, had been supplied by Craig.

Murphy was given a large paramilitary funeral by the UVF with a guard of honour wearing the UVF uniform and balaclavas. A volley of three shots was fired over his coffin as it was brought out of his house and a piper played "Abide With Me". He was buried in Carnmoney Cemetery; on his tombstone the following words were inscribed: "Here Lies a Soldier". May Blood, Baroness Blood, a Shankill Road community representative, said: "My father was a soldier. My father fought in two World Wars. They were real heroes. Lenny Murphy wasn't a hero; he was a murdering thug." The tombstone was smashed in 1989. His photograph was displayed inside "The Eagle", the UVF Brigade Staff's headquarters over a chip shop in the Shankill Road. According to investigative journalist Paul Larkin, it graced the walls as a "fallen officer" up until the late 1990s.

References

See also
 "Through a Veil of Blood and Tears", crimelibrary.com
 Political Murder in Northern Ireland'' Martin Dillon and Denis Lehane (Penguin, 1973)

1952 births
1982 deaths
Deaths by firearm in Northern Ireland
Irish serial killers
Male serial killers
Murdered serial killers
Paramilitaries from Belfast
People killed by the Provisional Irish Republican Army
People with antisocial personality disorder
Shankill Butchers
Ulster loyalists imprisoned by non-jury courts
Ulster loyalists imprisoned under Prevention of Terrorism Acts